John McDonald (19 September 1846 – 1932) was a noted Irish cultural nationalist poet during the nineteenth century Irish Literary Revival. Known for frequent contributions to weekly and periodical Irish publications, he published a book of poetry in 1886.

Biography

Born in the parish of Cloone in county Leitrim, John was the son of a small farmer and Roman Catholic. He completed his education in local schools before pursuing a teaching career.  From 1881, he lived in New York for a few years. McDonald married his wife Mary , and they raised eight children, named Michael, Patrick, Mary, John, Anne, Charles, and two unknown. The family lived at Cloonboniagh South townland near Dromod in county Leitrim, John running a farm whilst holding down a job as schoolteacher in county Longford. He died October 1932, and many of his children emigrated to America.

Poetry
An Irish cultural nationalist, McDonald contributed verse to periodicals such as "", "", "", "", and to local newspapers in county Leitrim and county Longford.  While living in America for a time, he published poetry in the "". McDonald's sole book, a collection of poetry titled "", was published in 1886. He wrote most of his poetry in his spare time, mainly at night or Sunday evenings, explaining his motivation thus-

 "".

One copy of the book is kept at Keenans Hotel -Tarmonbarry in county Roscommon, and another copy is kept in the archives of the National Library of Ireland in Dublin. Reprints of his poems appeared in the Leitrim Observer newspaper during the 1960s. All his poems usually appeared with the signature "".

Land League
McDonald was an Irish nationalist, supporting the Irish National Land League movement. Writing to John Devoy in 1881, John Sexton enthused "".

List of works

 Irish National Poems, Dublin, Sealy, Bryers & Walker, 1886. Bound with green cloth, title and author appear in gilt on upper cover and a gilt harp and bunch of shamrock in centre, gilt title on spine.

References and notes

Citations

Primary sources

Secondary sources

Further reading

1846 births
19th-century Irish poets
Irish schoolteachers
Irish farmers
People from County Leitrim
Year of death missing